Kelardasht Rural District was a rural district (dehestan) in Kelardasht District, Chalus County, Mazandaran Province, Iran. At the 2006 census, its population was 8,460, in 2,398 families. The rural district had 22 villages and divided into Kelardasht-e Gharbi Rural District and  Kelardasht-e Sharqi Rural District. Together with the village of Kelardasht, they elevated to county status.

References 

Former Rural Districts of Mazandaran Province

Chalus County